The Bangladesh Employees Welfare Board is a government board responsible for the welfare of government employees in Bangladesh and is located in Dhaka, Bangladesh. The board is headed by the director general, Nahid Rashid.

History
The Bangladesh Employees Welfare Board was established on 29 January 2004. In 2013, protestors from Jamaat-e-Islami Bangladesh and Hefazat-e-Islam Bangladesh damaged 53 buses of the board kept at its depot at Dilkusha. The government announced plans to build a 30-story highrise to generate income for the board. The board was updated through the passage of Bangladesh Employees Welfare Board (amendment) Act, 2017.

References

Government agencies of Bangladesh
2004 establishments in Bangladesh
Organisations based in Dhaka